The fifth and final season of the American Fox science fiction television series Fringe premiered on September 28, 2012, and concluded on January 18, 2013. The series is produced by Bad Robot Productions in association with Warner Bros. Television. The show was officially renewed for a 13-episode fifth season on April 26, 2012. The fifth season was released on DVD and Blu-ray in region 1 on May 7, 2013.

J. H. Wyman served as a sole showrunner during the last season, with four other writers: Alison Schapker, Graham Roland, David Fury and Kristin Cantrell. Lead actors Anna Torv, John Noble, Joshua Jackson, Jasika Nicole reprised their roles as Olivia Dunham, Walter Bishop, Peter Bishop, and Astrid Farnsworth, respectively. Previous series regulars Lance Reddick, Blair Brown and Seth Gabel returned as special guest stars.

This season takes place in 2036, the Observer-ruled dystopian future previously seen in Season 4's "Letters of Transit". The opening sequence for the season retains the one featured in "Letters of Transit", with terms including community, freedom, joy, imagination, individuality and free will.

The ninth episode of the season, "Black Blotter", serves as a "19th episode", showing hallucinations from Walter's drug trip. The hunt for the tapes which contain the plan to defeat the Observers, serve as the way to contain one story into one episode, thus creating a procedural side of storytelling.  

The fifth season was received positively by television critics, earning 78 out of 100 on the aggregate review website Metacritic, indicating a "generally favorable" critical reception. Reviewers praised the conclusion of the story, with most critics lauding the final scene. They said that the finale satisfied hardcore fans, created a great integration of elements from previous seasons and made a natural conclusion for the characters.

Cast

Main cast
 Anna Torv as Olivia Dunham
 Joshua Jackson as Peter Bishop
 Jasika Nicole as Astrid Farnsworth
 John Noble as Dr. Walter Bishop

Recurring cast
 Michael Kopsa as Captain Windmark
 Shaun Smyth as Anil
 Georgina Haig as Henrietta "Etta" Bishop
 Michael Cerveris as September/Donald
 Eugene Lipinski as December

Special guests
 Blair Brown as Nina Sharp
 Lance Reddick as Phillip Broyles
 Seth Gabel as Lincoln Lee

Season summary 
The fifth season takes place in 2036, 24 years after the conclusion of the fourth season; in 2012, with the information about Olivia's pregnancy. Numerous Observers from the 27th century, having made the Earth uninhabitable in their own time, traveled through time to take over the Earth from humanity, instituting a Purge to kill off a large fraction.

The remaining humans are tamed in an Orwellian manner by the Observers and their human Loyalist collaborating soldiers, though an underground resistance still eludes capture by the Observers. A common scene used through this season is one where Peter, Olivia, and their young daughter Etta are enjoying a picnic on the day of the Observers' arrival and conquering of the Earth in 2015; Etta goes missing in this scene during all the confusion and destruction.

Walter had been warned of this by September before the Observers' appearance and, with his help, devised a plan to defeat the Observers in the future, scattering key elements across various locations and leaving messages for the future on video tapes in his lab, which he then encased in amber to protect their discovery. September "partitioned" the plan in Walter's brain to make it impossible for anyone to retrieve without the use of a thought unifier, a piece of Observer technology.

Walter, Peter, Olivia, Astrid, and William Bell purposely ambered themselves soon afterward. They are recovered by Etta Bishop, revealed to be Peter and Olivia's adult child who had gone missing during the Observer invasion, and while a Fringe division member, also working with the underground along with Broyles.

Walter is soon captured by the lead Observer, Captain Windmark, who puts him under a vigorous memory scan that destroys Walter's memories of the plan, before he can be rescued. Despite this loss, the Fringe team consider clues left in the lab, and come across the tapes. They painstakingly recover each tape and follow its instructions, gathering the elements, including the (apparently) young Observer child first encountered in season 1 ("Inner Child"), later named Michael by his protectors. They find that an unseen man named Donald had helped to hide these elements with Walter.

Meanwhile, Olivia and Peter work with Etta and the underground to combat the Observers, but in one encounter, Windmark catches Etta and fatally wounds her; Etta counters by triggering an anti-matter device that wipes her and several other Observers and Loyalists out. Olivia is shocked for several days at the loss of her daughter, while Peter is enraged and, at one point, uses an Observer implant on himself in order to understand how the Observers work to enable him to get revenge on Windmark. This would have soon caused his brain to sacrifice areas dedicated to feelings and emotions in order to increase space for intellect and logic, which is what happened to the Observers originally - and would have been an irreversible process. Olivia finally manages to talk him out of it.

Michael proves difficult to communicate with, but after working with Nina Sharp at the cost of her life, they gain technology that can aid in communications. Michael reaches out to Walter, flooding his mind with memories, and revealing that the man Donald is really the Observer September. They are able to locate September, now more human due to his "biological reversion" by other Observers for aiding Fringe. September reveals the full extent of the plan: to use the parts to construct a time machine to send Michael forward in time to 2167 as to stop an experiment in human genetics that would lead to the creation of the Observers. September further reveals that Michael is his "son", grown in the future from his genetic material but had his maturation halted when it was discovered that his brain is different from other Observers' — capable of both superior intelligence and deep emotions. September helps Fringe to gather the remaining equipment, and reminding Walter that he will need to sacrifice himself for this plan.

As Captain Windmark and the Observers close in, Michael allows himself to be captured and taken to the high-secure facility on Liberty Island; Olivia takes Cortexiphan to allow her to jump to the parallel universe, travel safely to the open Liberty Island there with the aid of her doppelganger Fauxlivia and her friend Lincoln Lee, and jump back in the same manner. Though Michael is recovered, September finds the core initiating reactor for the time machine is insufficient, and pleads with December to get a new one from the future. Though December does so, he is caught and killed by the Observers. Astrid has the idea of using the wormhole-based shipping lanes as their conduit to the future, and the plan is quickly altered for this. Peter learns of Walter's plan to sacrifice himself to take the child into the future, necessary to prevent a time paradox. September offers to take Michael instead, having come to appreciate his role as a father, but he is shot by a stray bullet as they set up the wormhole, while Olivia, enhanced by the Cortexiphan, uses the power to smash Windmark between two cars and kill him. Walter recognizes his fate, and after looking back to Peter and Olivia, takes Michael through.

Time flashes back to the 2015 picnic, and the invasion of the Observers never occurs. On returning home, Peter finds a letter from Walter, containing only a slip of paper with a drawn white tulip.

Episodes

Production

Crew

In June 2012, it was announced that co-showrunner/executive producer Jeff Pinkner, who had been with the show since the second episode, would be departing. Pinkner's former co-showrunner, executive producer J. H. Wyman, serves as the sole showrunner during the final season. Series co-creators and former executive producers Alex Kurtzman and Roberto Orci, who have been credited as consulting producers since they left the series in the middle of the first season, are now no longer credited. Also, director/executive producer Joe Chappelle departed the series. Wyman announced that season five only was employing four writers, himself, Alison Schapker, Graham Roland, and David Fury. Later that number was revised to five, with script coordinator Kristin Cantrell scripting installment nine, "Black Blotter".

Before the start of the fifth season, J. H. Wyman stated that "another part of the challenge was to bring back things that you’ve forgotten about and maybe some things you haven’t forgotten about, recontextualize them and have the series make sense. That was really a very big part of what I was after, to make sure that [the viewers] would say, 'Oh, my gosh, I thought they forgot about that, but they didn’t.' There’s going to be a lot of that. There’s one, specifically, that’s going to be very impactful, I hope."

Anna Torv said that the opportunity to end the series properly is "a luxury that you don't always get. To be able to enjoy the last leg of what's turned into a marathon. Five years is a long time to spend with these characters. And we're making the most of it. The writers are excited to finish properly, without having to straddle the line of 'Could this be the end or not'?"

After Fringe was renewed for the fifth season, Jasika Nicole stated that she "was just really thankful we had four seasons. So when we found out that we did get a fifth season, it felt like it was such a gift to everybody who watched the show. This is what you get for being such genuine, sincere, consistent fans of this show. This is your payment. This is what you get for following us through different universes, different timelines, different characters, different timeslots. We were all over the place, and then I felt like the fifth season was a big thank-you to everybody who stuck with us for this long."

Joshua Jackson said that he was pleased with the way the story was concluded: "I feel like the entire fifth season has been the closing chapter of the Fringe story and that we were able to settle so much of the story along the way. With the finale, to put the finishing touches on Fringe and leave the characters in what feels like the right place, it all feels good right now. I think that Wyman wrote the perfect ending for Peter's story over all these years. His journey from prodigal son to dedicated father and husband is complete". John Noble stated that he "wasn't surprised by the general ending at all, actually. It seemed like there was only one way to end this story properly and beautifully."

Wyman admitted that "up until the very end, the very, very literal end, it didn't really come together until I think a week before I wrote it. I had a whole bunch of things and I'd change them. It's been a living breathing organism that's changed in so many ways."

Writing and filming

Filming of the season commenced on July 18, 2012. On July 24, 2012, production was temporarily halted as John Noble sought treatment for a sleep disorder, Blair Brown recuperated from a minor illness, and Jasika Nicole recovered from a minor car accident. Production resumed on August 7, 2012. 

Wyman said that the season's ninth episode acted as the season's episode 19, which is known for departing from the status quo. The two-hour series finale aired on January 18, 2013, which Wyman wrote and directed.

Prop master Rob Smith, who had worked on the series since the second season, worked on creating futuristic gadgets to help create the 2036 setting. He explained, "It’s not like we’re gonna get the iPhone version 25. Basically what [we saw] is that reality has changed, and we live in a computer-dominated society. It was an interesting extrapolation of what we did in the past." He added, "There [weren't] any real rules, we [tried] to make it look as believable as we could, but nobody really knows what it’s gonna be like. And furthermore, the reality that we’re depicting probably won’t be what it’s like in 25 years… I hope."

Casting

Seth Gabel, whose character, Lincoln Lee, had recurred in seasons two and three and then joined as a series regular in season four, does not return as a main cast member in season five, but he did reprise his role in the series finale. For the final season, Lance Reddick and Blair Brown are no longer credited among the main cast, and instead are credited under a "special appearance by" billing. Reddick and Brown each appeared in three episodes in the final season.

Major recurring characters in the fifth season include Michael Kopsa as Captain Windmark, the main antagonist of the season. Georgina Haig portrayed Henrietta "Etta" Bishop. She appeared in the first four episodes, and numerous times during the rest of the season in flashback or memories. Michael Cerveris reprised his role as a human version of September, Donald, in "Anomaly XB-6783746", "The Boy Must Live", "Liberty" and "An Enemy of Fate". Shaun Smith recurred as Anil, a member of Resistance. 

Guest stars in the season include Eric Lange as Manfretti in the second episode, "In Absentia". Among the other guest actors were Paul McGillion as Edwin Massey ("The Recordist"), Zak Santiago as Cecil ("Through the Looking Glass and What Walter Found There"), Gabe Khouth as Dr. Darryl Hastings ("Five-Twenty-Ten" and "Anomaly XB-6783746"), Tom Butler as Richard, and James Kidnie as The Commander (last three episodes). Jenni Blong reprised her role as Dr. Carla Warren in "Black Blotter", after previously appearing in the second-season episode "Peter". Eugene Lipinski reprised his role as December the Observer in the final two episodes; he previously recurred in seasons two to four. Jill Scott played Simone, an intuitive and oracle-like woman, in "The Human Kind".

Reception

Reviews

On Rotten Tomatoes, the season has an approval rating of 88% with an average score of 9 out of 10 based on 16 reviews. The website's critical consensus reads, "Fringe overcomes a compressed episode count and humbled production values to deliver a moving and rousing conclusion to its fans." Aggregate review site Metacritic gave the fifth season 78 out of 100 based on five critical reviews, indicating the "generally favorable" critical reception.

After watching the "Transilience Thought Unifier Model-11", Matt Roush of TV Guide wrote that  "this endgame for one of TV's most adventurous sci-fi fables is staged as a battle for mankind's survival against the invading Observers, who've poisoned the environment and eradicated hope: "Nothing grows from scorched earth," one Observer remarks. Fringe has always grounded its bold and entertaining imaginative storytelling in deep emotional realities, and this is especially true as time-tripping Peter (Joshua Jackson) and Olivia (Anna Torv) reunite with their now-grown daughter Etta (Georgina Haig), a resistance leader, while continuing to fret over Walter". Mike Hale of The New York Times also stated that "no matter how drastic the swings between seasons, an overall consistency has been maintained, helped by the tight focus on a relatively small number of relationships. Most important, it’s (Fringe) continued to combine ambitious storytelling with pulpy, Saturday-matinee energy."

Chris Cabin of Slant Magazine criticized the final season saying that "as Fringes ambitions have grown, the sense of real risk, danger, and punishment have diminished to close to nothing as the series nears what will likely be an inadequate conclusion". Writing for IGN, Ramsey Isler rated the fifth season with a score of 8 out of 10, stating that Fringes final season was a hit with hardcore fans, and praising the great integration of elements from previous seasons and emotional moments that gave the characters even more depth.

Ken Tucker of Entertainment Weekly gave the whole series a very positive review, saying that "in the end, Fringe — which concluded with a back-to-back, two-episode wallop on Friday night — fulfilled nearly every promise it made to its audience over the course of five seasons. It remained true to its core values: the primacy of family, the sacredness of trust, the joy of a good joke, the exhilaration of intellectual inquiry, and the jolting power of love", and concluded with a thought: "This is the legacy of Fringe. (That, and a Gene forever preserved in amber.) Now it’s up to us to carry that into our futures, and to be on the look-out for whatever television (of any kind, in any genre) can pick up on Fringe‘s ever-reverberating vibe. Why? I quote Walter from the final hour and one last time: "Because it's cool."

Ratings and broadcast
Fringe remained in its Friday night slot during its fifth season. "Transilience Thought Unifier Model-11" aired in the United States on September 28, 2012. An estimated 3.2 million viewers watched the episode. It earned a ratings share of 1.1 among adults aged 18 to 49. The episode was up slightly from the previous season finale, but less than Fringes fourth-season premiere rating of 1.5.

Fringe reached its lowest ratings ever with the episode "The Boy Must Live" which first aired in the United States on January 11, 2013 on Fox to an estimated 2.44 million viewers, and earned a ratings share of 0.8 among adults aged 18 to 49.

The two-part series finale, "Liberty" and "An Enemy of Fate" earned Fringe its highest rating of the season, with 3.2 million viewers and a 1.0 rating for adults 18-49.

Awards and nominations
Fringe received six nominations for the 39th Saturn Awards, including Best Network Television Series and nominations each for Anna Torv, Joshua Jackson and John Noble in the Best Actress, Actor and Supporting Actor categories respectively. Blair Brown and Lance Reddick have both been nominated for a Best Guest-Starring Role In a Series.

References

External links
 
 

2012 American television seasons
2013 American television seasons
5
Television series set in the 2030s